Cisco Independent School District is a public school district based in Cisco, Texas, United States.  Located in Eastland County, a very small portion of the district extends into Callahan County.

Cisco Junior College was originally part of the district until 1956, when it became a stand-alone entity.

Rupert N. Richardson, a Texas historian who was later the president of Hardin-Simmons University in Abilene, was principal at Cisco High School from 1915 to 1916.

In 2009, the school district was rated "recognized" by the Texas Education Agency.

Schools
 Cisco High School (grades 9–12)
 Cisco Junior High (grades 6–8)
 Cisco Elementary (grades PK–5)

References

External links
 

School districts in Eastland County, Texas
School districts in Callahan County, Texas